Kottingbrunn is a town in the district of Baden in Lower Austria in Austria.

Population

People 
 Henryk Jasiczek, Polish poet from Zaolzie, was born here.

References

External links 

Cities and towns in Baden District, Austria